The 1995–96 League of Ireland Premier Division was the 11th season of the League of Ireland Premier Division. The division was made up of 12 teams. St Patrick's Athletic F.C. won the title.

Regular season
This season saw each team playing three rounds of games, playing every other team three times, totalling 33 games.

Final table

Results

Matches 1–22

Matches 23–33

Promotion/relegation play-off
Athlone Town who finished in tenth place played off against Home Farm Everton, the third placed team from the 1995–96 League of Ireland First Division.

1st Leg

2nd Leg

Home Farm Everton won 4–3 on penalties and were promoted to the Premier Division.

See also
 1995–96 League of Ireland First Division

References

Ireland
1995–96 in Republic of Ireland association football
League of Ireland Premier Division seasons